The Rottalhorn (3,972 m) is a mountain of the Bernese Alps, located on the border between the Swiss cantons of Bern and Valais. It lies 600 m south of the Jungfrau, between the small valley of the Rottal and the Jungfraufirn (part of the Aletsch Glacier).

References

External links
 Rottalhorn on Hikr

Bernese Alps
Mountains of the Alps
Alpine three-thousanders
Mountains of Switzerland
Mountains of Valais
Mountains of the canton of Bern
Bern–Valais border
Three-thousanders of Switzerland